Broad Brook is a neighborhood and census-designated place (CDP) in the town of East Windsor, Hartford County, Connecticut, United States. As of the 2010 census, the CDP population was 4,069.

Geography
The Broad Brook CDP occupies most of the east-central part of the town of East Windsor. It is bordered to the east by the town of Ellington in Tolland County, to the south by Chamberlain Road and Ketch Brook, to the west by the Scantic River, and to the north by Connecticut Route 140 and a portion of Broad Brook, the community's namesake waterway.

Demographics
As of the census of 2000, there were 3,469 people, 1,433 households, and 932 families residing in the CDP. The racial makeup of the CDP was 91.76% White, 4.44% African American, 1.53% Asian, 1.04% from other races, and 1.24% from two or more races. Hispanic or Latino of any race were 2.16% of the population.

There were 1,433 households, out of which 33.4% had children under the age of 18 living with them, 51.2% were married couples living together, 10.3% had a female householder with no husband present, and 34.9% were non-families. 28.3% of all households were made up of individuals, and 9.6% had someone living alone who was 65 years of age or older.  The average household size was 2.42 and the average family size was 3.00.

In the CDP, the population was spread out, with 45.5% under the age of 18, 6.7% from 18 to 24, 34.4% from 25 to 44, 21.5% from 45 to 64, and 11.6% who were 65 years of age or older.  The median age was 37 years. For every 100 females, there were 93.5 males.  For every 100 females age 18 and over, there were 89.5 males.

The median income for a household in the CDP was $50,417, and the median income for a family was $58,138. Males had a median income of $38,222 versus $32,250 for females. The per capita income for the CDP was $23,244.  About 3.5% of families and 4.6% of the population were below the poverty line, including 4.0% of those under age 18 and 7.6% of those age 65 or over.

Notable residents
Jerry Marquis, NASCAR 2000 Featherlite Modified champion

References 

East Windsor, Connecticut
Census-designated places in Hartford County, Connecticut
Neighborhoods in Connecticut
Census-designated places in Connecticut